Zanjeer may refer to:

 Zanjeer (1973 film), a 1973 film starring Amitabh Bachchan and Jaya Bachchan
 Zanjeer (1998 film), a 1998 Bollywood action film
 Zanjeer (2013 film), a 2013 film starring Ram Charan and Priyanka Chopra
 Zanjeer (dog), a bomb-sniffing dog who served with distinction during the 1993 Mumbai bombings
 Zanjir, a type of chain used in Mourning of Muharram